Martin Tinley (b Glemsford  24 July 1605 - d London 31 January 1647)  was an Anglican priest in the 17th century.

Tinley was educated at Westminster School and Christ Church, Oxford. He became the incumbent at Lisnagarvey in 1637; Treasurer of Dromore in 1638; Archdeacon of Stafford in 1640; Rector of St Paul's Walden in 1642; and Archdeacon of Cork  in 1662.

References

People educated at Westminster School, London
Alumni of Christ Church, Oxford
Archdeacons of Cork
1605 births
1647 deaths
Archdeacons of Stafford
People from Suffolk (before 1974)